Calosphaeria is a genus of fungi in the family Calosphaeriaceae.

Species

Calosphaeria abieticola
Calosphaeria abietis
Calosphaeria acaciae
Calosphaeria acerina
Calosphaeria affinis
Calosphaeria africana
Calosphaeria albojuncta
Calosphaeria alnicola
Calosphaeria alpina
Calosphaeria ambigua
Calosphaeria annonae
Calosphaeria arctica
Calosphaeria assecta
Calosphaeria aurata
Calosphaeria azadirachtae
Calosphaeria benedicta
Calosphaeria biformis
Calosphaeria capillaris
Calosphaeria caraganae
Calosphaeria chilensis
Calosphaeria ciliatula
Calosphaeria cinchonae
Calosphaeria connaricarpa
Calosphaeria cornicola
Calosphaeria corylina
Calosphaeria crataegi
Calosphaeria cryptospora
Calosphaeria cyclospora
Calosphaeria cylindrica
Calosphaeria dryina
Calosphaeria expers
Calosphaeria fagi
Calosphaeria fagicola
Calosphaeria fallax
Calosphaeria fici
Calosphaeria finkii
Calosphaeria fumanae
Calosphaeria gregaria
Calosphaeria hylodes
Calosphaeria idaeicola
Calosphaeria inconspicua
Calosphaeria indica
Calosphaeria ipomoeae
Calosphaeria jonkershoekensis
Calosphaeria jungens
Calosphaeria kriegeriana
Calosphaeria lantanae
Calosphaeria ludens
Calosphaeria ludwigiana
Calosphaeria macrospora
Calosphaeria microsperma
Calosphaeria miniata
Calosphaeria obvallata
Calosphaeria obvoluta
Calosphaeria occulta
Calosphaeria pachydermata
Calosphaeria parasitica
Calosphaeria pezizoidea
Calosphaeria pirellifera
Calosphaeria pleurostoma
Calosphaeria polyblasta
Calosphaeria princeps
Calosphaeria pulchella
Calosphaeria pulchelloidea
Calosphaeria punicae
Calosphaeria pusilla
Calosphaeria recedens
Calosphaeria reniformis
Calosphaeria rhododendri
Calosphaeria rimicola
Calosphaeria rosarum
Calosphaeria rubicola
Calosphaeria salicis-babylonicae
Calosphaeria scabriseta
Calosphaeria smilacis
Calosphaeria socialis
Calosphaeria striiformis
Calosphaeria subcuticularis
Calosphaeria sulcata
Calosphaeria taediosa
Calosphaeria tetraspora
Calosphaeria transversa
Calosphaeria tumidula
Calosphaeria ulmicola
Calosphaeria vasculosa
Calosphaeria verrucosa
Calosphaeria wahlenbergii

External links

Sordariomycetes genera
Calosphaeriales